Susan Villiers may refer to:

Susan Feilding, Countess of Denbigh (1583–1652), née Villiers,  English courtier
Susan Villiers (nurse) (1863–1945), English fever nurse and nursing leader